Bahadurpur is a village in Palitana taluk of Bhavnagar district, Gujarat. It is not more than 10 km from Palitana taluka. The very famous Shatrunjaya mountain hills of Palitana wiz known for hundreds of Jain Palitana temples.

At the entry point of this small village, you will find a peaceful Aashram built decades ago having a very beautifully built temple. Just outside of this Ashram's gate, Gujarat Government has built a small bus-stop for this village though center of this village is almost 1 km away from this bus-stop. This village is facilitated by primary school and panchayat.

People of this village are migrated to different cities of Gujarat. Most of them are settled in Surat, Ankleshwar, Navsari, Vapi etc.

Villages in Bhavnagar district